Berta Aliana was an Argentine actress and tango singer.

Filmography
  Women Who Work (1938)
  Jettatore (1938)
  Margarita, Armando y su padre (1939)
 The Tango Star (1940)
 Los Celos de Cándida (1940)
  Ha entrado un ladrón (1940)
 Marriage in Buenos Aires (1940)
 La piel de zapa (1943)

Bibliography

External links
 

Argentine film actresses
Tango singers
Year of death missing
Year of birth missing